Advanced statistics (also known as analytics or APBRmetrics) in basketball refers to analyzing basketball statistics through objective evidence. APBRmetrics is a cousin to the study of baseball statistics, known as sabermetrics, and similarly takes its name from the acronym APBR, which stands for the Association for Professional Basketball Research.

A key tenet for many modern basketball analysts is that basketball is best evaluated at the level of possessions. During a single game, both teams have approximately the same number of possessions, because they alternate possession. (A team can have slightly more if it begins and ends a quarter or half with possession.) However, over the course of the season, teams play at very different paces, which can dramatically color their points scored and points allowed per game. Therefore, these analysts favor use of points scored per 100 possessions (offensive rating) and points allowed per 100 possessions (defensive rating).

A second core tenet is that per-minute statistics are more useful for evaluating players than per-game statistics. From John Hollinger's Pro Basketball Forecast: 

A more complete explanation of possession-based analysis is available in "A Starting Point for Analyzing Basketball Statistics" in the Journal of Quantitative Analysis in Sports.

History
While the use of possession stats dates back at least as far as former North Carolina Coach Frank McGuire, modern quantitative basketball analysis came into existence when Bill James gained popularity for his Baseball Abstracts and basketball enthusiasts borrowed some of the ideas and the overall philosophy of the importance of statistical analysis for fine-tuning achievement. Early basketball analysts focused on "linear weights" statistics, which assign a value to each key statistic and add and subtract to find a player's total efficiency, usually on a per-minute basis and various brands of this were created and often became the basis for books. Among these people were Dave Heeren, Bob Bellotti, and Martin Manley.

Beginning in the 1990s, Dean Oliver began to popularize the use of possession statistics. Oliver and John Hollinger are credited with moving this use of basketball statistics into the view of more basketball fans through their websites in the late 1990s. Oliver published his book Basketball on Paper in 2003, while Hollinger began writing the Pro Basketball Forecast series in 2002.

In the wake of the best-selling book Moneyball, which glamorized sabermetrics, quantitative basketball analysis began to receive some attention from the media and NBA teams. The goal was to find a more objective method of analyzing player performance and to find the most productive mix of players within the salary cap or budget.

In 2004, Oliver was hired as a full-time consultant by the Seattle SuperSonics, making him the first publicly acknowledged APBRmetrician to be employed by an NBA team full time.

The Houston Rockets took the movement one step further in April 2006 by hiring Daryl Morey as their assistant general manager and announcing that he would replace Carroll Dawson as general manager after the 2006–07 season. Morey, previously senior vice president of operations and information for the Boston Celtics, had provided statistical analysis for the Celtics front office and wrote a little about advanced statistics for the Celtics web site but had no traditional basketball experience as a player, coach or scout.

The website 82games.com, which debuted in 2003, brought the analysis of plus-minus ratings—how well a team fares with a certain player or lineup on the floor as opposed to on the bench—and counterpart production into the mainstream basketball knowledge (it had long been a common measurement in ice hockey).

Common statistics 
Among the growing list of advanced basketball statistics, here are some of the simplest and most important ones gaining increased usage:

Offensive rating/offensive efficiency and defensive rating/defensive efficiency, on a team level, are calculated as points scored and points allowed per 100 possessions. Possessions are usually estimated by the following formula: 

The .44 accounts for the fact that when a player scores a basket and is fouled, they shoot a free throw, which is not a possession. This is also true of flagrant fouls and technical fouls, while three free throws make up one possession when a player is fouled shooting a 3-pointer. It should also be noted that when analyzing college basketball, APBRmetricians have used .475 as the free-throw multiplier, since the NCAA's rules about the team foul limit differ from those in the NBA.

Offensive rebounds are subtracted because grabbing an offensive rebound simply extends the original possession, rather than creating a new possession. If offensive rebounds were not subtracted in this manner, opposing teams would not necessarily have the same number of possessions in a game.

The .96 multiplier adjusts for team rebounds. Because these are not considered offensive rebounds, the formula slightly overestimates the number of possessions per team without the multiplier.

Therefore, team ratings are simply calculated as:

and

In addition to pioneering team offensive and defensive ratings, Dean Oliver adapted them to players in his book Basketball on Paper.

Effective technical shooting percentage (EFT%) accounts for the fact that 3-pointers are worth an extra point, something ignored by traditional field-goal percentage.  This is important where one player shoots 6 layups, and makes 3 of them, while another player shoots 6 three point shots and makes 2 of them.  Both players have scored 6 points on 6 shots, yet the first player's FG% is 50 percent, and the second player's FG% is only 33 percent.  The second player looks like a terrible shooter even though he has scored just as many points on just as many shots.  Effective field-goal percentage corrects for this by accounting for the extra point that 3-pointers are worth.

The formula is:

True shooting percentage takes this a step further by factoring in free throws. It is essentially points scored per shooting possession, but divided by two to look like field-goal percentage—PTS/(2*(FGA + (.44*FTA)))

Rebound rate is the estimated percentage of available rebounds a player or team grabs.

Real adjusted player efficiency rating is John Hollinger's linear-weights rating for a player's per-minute performance which reduces a player's total performance into a single number.

Pythagorean record is what a team's expected record is based on points scored or allowed. This can be found by PF^14/(PF^14 + PA^14)

There are also several versions of passing ratings, a usage rating that measures how well a player does with the possession he uses, other general and skill specific defensive ratings and many other statistics and analytic ratios to aid understanding of player and team performance.

Per 87.5 is an adjusted variation of Per 100 and Per 75. However it is different in some ways. First off it adjusts for the pace that a team or league has. Secondly it adjusts for player rates as well rebound rate, assist rate etc. Finally Per 87.5 takes into account DRTG and ORTG into its formula. Speaking of which the formula is. (Player Statistic/Pace/Possessions*7500/(OPR or DPR)*ORTG or DRTG)

In the formula you would adjust accordingly depending on what statistic you are using whether it is Assists, Rebounds etc.

Notable quantitative basketball analysts
The growing field of quantitative analysts in basketball includes, but is not limited to, the following:

Ben Alamar is the founding editor of the Journal of Quantitative Analysis in Sports. He was the director of Sports Analytics at ESPN and was a consultant to the Oklahoma City Thunder.

Roland Beech is the proprietor of 82games.com and has contributed his analysis to ESPN.com and SI.com. He was a consultant for the Dallas Mavericks.

Bob Bellotti was one of the first APBRmetricians, having invented "Points Created", a player rating system that attempted to boil all of a player's contributions into one number (similar to Bill James' runs created). Bellotti wrote several books in the late 1980s and early 1990s, and contributed to the NBA's official encyclopedia, Total Basketball.

Bob Chaikin is currently a basketball analyst for the Miami Heat, since the 2008–09 season. He worked previously (2003–04 to 2007–08) for the Portland Trail Blazers, and consulted earlier with the New Jersey Nets (early 1990s) and Miami Heat (mid-1990s). He is developer of the B-BALL NBA simulation software program used in the statistical analysis of NBA teams and players. He is also developer of the historical sports statistics databases for pro baseball, basketball, football, and hockey located at bballsports.com.

John Hollinger authored four books in the Pro Basketball Forecast/Prospectus series and was a regular columnist for ESPN Insider. His player evaluation rating (PER) is a better linear metric system than most of what preceded it but it is greatly influenced by a player's offensive usage; in the minds of some, too much so. It also lacks any assessment of shot defense and that distorts the view of who is good and not. Hollinger's work is read by many mainstream fans who are not familiar with APBRmetrics in general, making him instrumental in introducing the system to regular NBA fans. He was the vice president of basketball operations for the Memphis Grizzlies.

Justin Kubatko created and maintained the website Basketball-Reference.com, the pro basketball arm of Sports Reference LLC, until his departure from the company on August 24, 2013. During Kubatko's tenure, Sports Reference was named one of the 50 best websites of 2010 by Time magazine and won an Alpha Award for Best Analytics Innovation/Technology at the 2013 MIT Sloan Sports Analytics Conference. Kubatko was also a statistical consultant for the Portland Trail Blazers for three years and has written numerous pieces for The New York Times and ESPN.com. He is currently president of Statitudes LLC.

Dean Oliver is a former Division 3 player and assistant coach at Cal Tech (which almost never won a game) and a scout, who has consulted with the Seattle SuperSonics and also served in the front office of the Denver Nuggets and the Sacramento Kings. He is currently an assistant coach with the Washington Wizards. His old website, Journal of Basketball Studies, and subsequent 2003 book, Basketball on Paper, brought him some recognition as a principal leader in the field. His research dealt with the importance of pace and possessions, how teamwork affects individual statistics, initial crude defensive statistics, and the highly debated topic of the importance of a player's ability to create their own shot. His efforts to bring focus on the "Four Factors of Basketball Success" (field-goal shooting, offensive rebounds, turnovers and getting to the free-throw line) also help provide a simple framework for evaluation of players and teams.

Kevin 'Al' Pelton is a sportswriter who writes for ESPN.com and has previously written for BasketballProspectus.com, 82games.com, Hoopsworld.com and SI.com. Pelton formerly covered the Seattle Storm and Seattle SuperSonics for their respective websites. He was also a consultant for the Indiana Pacers. 

Dan Rosenbaum was a consultant for the Cleveland Cavaliers and the Atlanta Hawks. Rosenbaum's early work focused on adjusted plus-minus ratings, which takes into account the quality of the players playing with and against a player and adjusts his plus-minus accordingly. 

Jeff Sagarin and Wayne Winston pioneered adjusted plus-minus statistics with their WINVAL system, which was first used extensively by the Dallas Mavericks.

See also
Network Science Based Basketball Analytics

References

External links
Association for Professional Basketball Research

Basketball statistics